James Wilson is an American guitarist in the band Mother Superior, and previously in the Rollins Band. He is a professional musician known for his soulful vocals and powerful blues-rock guitar work. He also plays guitar and bass with Daniel Lanois. Wilson hails from Delaware, but currently resides in Los Angeles, California.

Biography
Wilson was born in Delaware. A founding member of the blues rock trio Mother Superior who as a band have worked with Lemmy, Queens of the Stone Age, Alice Cooper, Meat Loaf, Emmylou Harris, Anthrax, Wayne Kramer, George Clinton, and Iggy Pop. They were also approached by Henry Rollins in 1999 and asked to become 3/4 of the Rollins Band, an offer they accepted. Mother Superior released their eighth studio album Three Headed Dog in 2007. Along with the other members of Mother Superior, Wilson has recorded and appeared with Daniel Lanois in 2006, 2007, 2011 and 2014.

Wilson has also made live appearances with Sparks, notably in 2008 during the Sparks Spectacular, where they played each of their 21 albums in their entirety over 21 nights in London.

He toured with Daniel Lanois and has taken back the mantle of lead singer for Motor Sister, a project of his with Scott Ian (guitar), Joey Vera (bass), John Tempesta (drums), and Pearl Aday (vocals).

Discography
Mother Superior

With Rollins Band

With Motor Sister

References

External links
The magic of Motor Sister: An interview with Jim Wilson

American blues guitarists
American male guitarists
American rock guitarists
Singers from Delaware
Living people
Alternative metal guitarists
Year of birth missing (living people)
Songwriters from Delaware
Guitarists from Delaware
Rollins Band members
American male songwriters